The 2011 season was Woodlands Wellington's 16th competitive and consecutive season in the top flight of Singapore football and 24th year in existence as a football club.

Transfers

In

Pre-season

Mid-Season

Out

Pre-season

Mid-Season

Squads

First team squad

S.League

League table

Overview

Matches

RHB Singapore Cup

First round

Singapore League Cup

First round

Appearances and Goals

|-

** Amos Boon, Adrian Butters, Graham Tatters and Leonardo Aleixa da Costa were released from the club during the mid-season window.
** Ali Imran Lomri was transferred to Singapore Recreation Club during the mid-season window.
** Navin Neil Vanu was transferred to Courts Young Lions during the mid-season window.
*** Denotes Prime League players

Goalscoring statistics

Includes all competitive matches. The list is sorted by shirt number when total goals are equal.
{| class="wikitable" style="font-size: 95%; text-align: center;"
|-
!width=15|
!width=15|
!width=15|
!width=15|
!width=150|Name
!width=80|S-League
!width=80|RHB Singapore Cup
!width=80|2011 Singapore League Cup
!width=80|Total
|-
|1
|16
|FW
|
|Moon Soon-Ho
|8
|0
|0
|8
|-
|2
|9
|FW
|
|Goh Swee Swee
|5
|0
|0
|5
|-
|3
|9
|FW
|
|Leo Costa**
|2
|0
|0
|2
|-
|4
|2
|DF
|
|Adrian Butters**
|0
|1
|0
|1
|-
|rowspan="7"|5
|5
|DF
|
|Sahairi Ramri
|1
|0
|0
|1
|-
|16
|DF
|
|Graham Tatters**
|1
|0
|0
|1
|-
|8
|MF
|
|Jalal
|1
|0
|0
|1
|-
|10
|MF
|
|Guntur Djafril
|1
|0
|0
|1
|-
|13
|MF
|
|Ali Imran Lomri**
|1
|0
|0
|1
|-
|20
|MF
|
|Hyun Jong-Woon
|1
|0
|0
|1
|-
|37
|FW
|
|Navin Neil Vanu**
|1
|0
|0
|1
|-
|colspan="4"|
|TOTALS
|22
|1
|0
|23

** Adrian Butters, Graham Tatters and Leonardo Aleixa da Costa were released from the club during the mid-season window.
** Ali Imran Lomri was transferred to Singapore Recreation Club during the mid-season window.
** Navin Neil Vanu was transferred to Courts Young Lions during the mid-season window.

Disciplinary record
Includes all competitive matches. The list is sorted by shirt number when total cards are equal.
{| class="wikitable" style="font-size: 95%; text-align: center;"
|-
| rowspan="2" style="width:2.5%; text-align:center;"|
| rowspan="2" style="width:3%; text-align:center;"|
| rowspan="2" style="width:3%; text-align:center;"|
| rowspan="2" style="width:3%; text-align:center;"|
| rowspan="2" style="width:12%; text-align:center;"|Name
| colspan="3" style="text-align:center;"|S-League
| colspan="3" style="text-align:center;"|RHB Singapore Cup
| colspan="3" style="text-align:center;"|Singapore League Cup
| colspan="3" style="text-align:center;"|Total
|-
! style="width:25px; background:#fe9;"|
! style="width:28px; background:#ff8888;"|
! style="width:25px; background:#ff8888;"|
! style="width:25px; background:#fe9;"|
! style="width:28px; background:#ff8888;"|
! style="width:25px; background:#ff8888;"|
! style="width:25px; background:#fe9;"|
! style="width:28px; background:#ff8888;"|
! style="width:25px; background:#ff8888;"|
! style="width:35px; background:#fe9;"|
! style="width:35px; background:#ff8888;"|
! style="width:35px; background:#ff8888;"|
|-
|1
|16
|DF
|
|Graham Tatters**
|3
|0
|2
|0
|0
|0
|0
|0
|0
|3
|0
|2
|-
|2
|11
|DF
|
|Darrel Tan
|2
|0
|1
|0
|0
|0
|0
|0
|0
|2
|0
|1
|-
|3
|19
|MF
|
|Han Yiguang
|11
|0
|0
|1
|0
|0
|0
|0
|0
|12
|0
|0
|-
|4
|8
|MF
|
|Sazali Salleh
|8
|0
|0
|0
|0
|0
|1
|0
|0
|9
|0
|0
|-
|5
|9
|FW
|
|Goh Swee Swee
|8
|0
|0
|0
|0
|0
|0
|0
|0
|8
|0
|0
|-
|rowspan="4"|6
|5
|DF
|
|Sahairi Ramri
|5
|0
|0
|0
|0
|0
|1
|0
|0
|6
|0
|0
|-
|6
|DF
|
|Munier Raychouni
|6
|0
|0
|0
|0
|0
|0
|0
|0
|6
|0
|0
|-
|12
|DF
|
|Madhu Mohana
|6
|0
|0
|0
|0
|0
|0
|0
|0
|6
|0
|0
|-
|37
|FW
|
|Navin Neil Vanu**
|6
|0
|0
|0
|0
|0
|0
|0
|0
|6
|0
|0
|-
|7
|13
|MF
|
|Ali Imran Lomri**
|4
|0
|0
|0
|0
|0
|0
|0
|0
|4
|0
|0
|-
|rowspan="2"|8
|8
|MF
|
|Jalal
|3
|0
|0
|0
|0
|0
|0
|0
|0
|3
|0
|0
|-
|10
|MF
|
|Guntur Djafril
|2
|0
|0
|0
|0
|0
|1
|0
|0
|3
|0
|0
|-
|rowspan="5"|9
|2
|DF
|
|Adrian Butters**
|2
|0
|0
|0
|0
|0
|0
|0
|0
|2
|0
|0
|-
|4
|MF
|
|Syed Karim
|2
|0
|0
|0
|0
|0
|0
|0
|0
|2
|0
|0
|-
|16
|FW
|
|Moon Soon-Ho
|2
|0
|0
|0
|0
|0
|0
|0
|0
|2
|0
|0
|-
|17
|MF
|
|Shahri Musa
|2
|0
|0
|0
|0
|0
|0
|0
|0
|2
|0
|0
|-
|18
|GK
|
|Ang Bang Heng
|2
|0
|0
|0
|0
|0
|0
|0
|0
|2
|0
|0
|-
|rowspan="4"|10
|2
|DF
|
|Fumiya Kobayashi
|1
|0
|0
|0
|0
|0
|0
|0
|0
|1
|0
|0
|-
|4
|MF
|
|Nawfal Shahib
|1
|0
|0
|0
|0
|0
|0
|0
|0
|1
|0
|0
|-
|15
|FW
|
|Leo Costa**
|1
|0
|0
|0
|0
|0
|0
|0
|0
|1
|0
|0
|-
|20
|MF
|
|Hyun Jong-Woon
|1
|0
|0
|0
|0
|0
|0
|0
|0
|1
|0
|0
|-
|colspan="4"|
|TOTALS
|75
|0
|3
|1
|0
|0
|3
|0
|0
|79
|0
|3
|-

** Adrian Butters, Graham Tatters and Leonardo Aleixa da Costa were released from the club during the mid-season window.
** Ali Imran Lomri was transferred to Singapore Recreation Club during the mid-season window.
** Navin Neil Vanu was transferred to Courts Young Lions during the mid-season window.

References

Woodlands Wellington
Woodlands Wellington FC seasons